Covington is a city in Hill County in central Texas, United States. It was founded by Colonel James Jackson Gathings, formerly of North Carolina and Mississippi, in the spring of 1852, and is named for his wife's family. The population of Covington, 158 years later, was 269 at the 2010 census.

Geography

Covington is located in northern Hill County at  (32.176850, –97.257104). State Highway 171 leads southeast  to Hillsboro, the county seat, and northwest  to Cleburne, while Farm Road 67 leads northeast  to Interstate 35 and southwest the same distance to Blum.

Demographics

As of the census of 2000, there were 282 people, 111 households, and 79 families residing in the city. The population density was 339.8 people per square mile (131.2/km2). There were 122 housing units at an average density of 147.0 per square mile (56.8/km2). The racial makeup of the city was 90.78% White, 3.19% African American, 0.35% Native American, 2.84% from other races, and 2.84% from two or more races. Hispanic or Latino of any race were 6.38% of the population.

There were 111 households, out of which 31.5% had children under the age of 18 living with them, 55.0% were married couples living together, and 28.8% were non-families. 22.5% of all households were made up of individuals, and 9.9% had someone living alone who was 65 years of age or older. The average household size was 2.54 and the average family size was 2.99.

In the city, the population was spread out, with 27.0% under the age of 18, 10.3% from 18 to 24, 26.2% from 25 to 44, 24.1% from 45 to 64, and 12.4% who were 65 years of age or older. The median age was 35 years. For every 100 females, there were 86.8 males. For every 100 females age 18 and over, there were 94.3 males.

The median income for a household in the city was $38,214, and the median income for a family was $45,179. Males had a median income of $35,972 versus $23,750 for females. The per capita income for the city was $18,874. About 13.9% of families and 9.6% of the population were below the poverty line, including 4.4% of those under the age of eighteen and 23.4% of those 65 or over.

Education
The city is served by the Covington Independent School District.

In the early 1860s, Gathings College was founded by brothers James and Philip Gathings. It quickly became the largest school in the state with an enrollment that exceeded 200 students. The first president of the college was one Dr. Church, who brought his own staff of teachers. The school offered classes in languages, literature, music, and art. Attendance dwindled to nearly nothing after the Civil War. Some manner of school continued to operate in the building until it became incorporated into the Covington Independent School District. The original building no longer stands, but the site is marked with an historical placard.

References

External links
Covington, Texas, in the Handbook of Texas
Gathings College historical marker at StoppingPoints.com 

Cities in Texas
Cities in Hill County, Texas